Spanner is a surname. Notable people with the surname include:

 Anita Spanner (born 1960), Austrian singer Anita
 Chimp Spanner (fl. 2000s), pseudonym of musician Paul Ortiz
 Rudolf Spanner (fl. 1940s), German physician
 Russel Spanner (1916 - 1974), a Canadian designer

German-language surnames

de:Spanner